The Naughtiest Girl Again is the second novel in The Naughtiest Girl series of novels by Enid Blyton. It is about older and not-so-spoiled Elizabeth Allen is in her second term at Whyteleafe School.

Plot
Elizabeth Allen, older and no longer having a spoiled personality, goes on to her second term at Whyteleafe School. She makes two enemies, Robert and Kathleen. Robert is a bully and Kathleen plays mean tricks on Jenny and Elizabeth. Elizabeth does not want to misbehave again, but someone tries to make sure that she does not forget her nickname of 'The Naughtiest Girl in the School'. Elizabeth tries to hunt down the sneak who is playing tricks on her and her friend Joan, leading to many adventures.

New characters
Kathleen:
She is described as a mean, ugly girl who is jealous of others because of their good looks. She plays spiteful tricks on Elizabeth and Jenny and almost runs away due to the consequences. But in the end she overcomes her flaws and becomes more likeable.

Jenny:
Jenny is a nice girl. She has a talent for mimicking others, she accidentally mimics Mamzelle scolding Kathleen, which encourages Kathleen play tricks on her. She is also very fond of white mice.

Robert:
Robert is the main antagonist of the book, he was a bully because he had been jealous of his younger brothers, who has been given more attention, and everyone forgot about him. He is also fond of riding and is in charge of horses. He changes his attitude and becomes a friend of Elizabeth's.

External links
Enid Blyton Society page

1942 British novels
Novels by Enid Blyton
1942 children's books
Novels set in boarding schools
George Newnes Ltd books